Rajya Sabha elections were held in 1962 to elect members of the Rajya Sabha, Indian Parliament's upper chamber.

Elections
Elections were held in 1962 to elect members from various states.
The list is incomplete.

Members elected
The following members were elected in the elections held in 1962. They were members for the term 1962-68 and retired in year 1968, except in case of the resignation or death before the term.

State - Member - Party

Bye-elections
The following bye elections were held in the year 1962.

State - Member - Party

 Orissa - Satyanand Mishra  -  INC ( ele 07/04/1962 term till 1964 )
 Rajasthan - Nemi chand Kasliwal - INC ( ele 07/04/1962 term till 1964 )
 Delhi - Sardar Santosh Singh - INC ( ele 16/04/1962 term till 1968 )
 Jammu and Kashmir - A M Tariq - INC ( ele 16/04/1962 term till 1966 res 04/03/1965)
 Madras - K Santhanam - INC ( ele 17/04/1962 term till 1964 )
 Uttar Pradesh - Krishna Chand- INC ( ele 19/04/1962 term till 1964 )
 Uttar Pradesh - Dr Jawaharlal Rohtagi - INC ( ele 19/04/1962 term till 1964 )
 Uttar Pradesh - Mahavir Prasad Shukla - INC ( ele 19/04/1962 term till 1964 )
 West Bengal  - Nikunj Behari Maiti - INC ( ele 25/04/1962 term till 1968 )
 Punjab - Abdul Ghani Dar - INC ( ele 16/06/1962 term till 1968 ) res 23/02/1967 4LS
 Assam -  A Thanglura - INC ( ele 20/06/1962 term till 1964 )
 Andhra - B Ramakrishna Rao  - INC ( ele 21/06/1962 term till 1966 )
 Maharashtra  - Bidesh T Kulkarni - INC ( ele 05/07/1962 term till 1968 )
 Bihar - Shyamnandan Mishra - INC ( ele 04/12/1962 term till 1966 )

References

1962 elections in India
1962